The 2012 Albany Panthers season was the third season as a professional indoor football franchise and their first in the Professional Indoor Football League (PIFL).

The team played their home games under head coach Lucious Davis at the James H. Gray Civic Center in Albany, Georgia.

The Panthers finished their 2012 regular season at 10-2, with their two losses coming on the road and by a combined score of three points, clinching the #1 seed in the playoffs. They beat the Columbus Lions 60-36 in the first round, ensuring they would host their second straight championship game. The Panthers were quarterbacked by both Cecil Lester and Darnell Kennedy. On June 30, 2012, they won PIFL Cup I, 60-56, against the Richmond Raiders. The win gave the Panthers back-to-back Championships, while playing in two different leagues. The win also increased their home winning streak to eleven games.

Schedule
Key:

Regular season
All start times are local to home team

Postseason

Roster

Division Standings

References

External links
2012 Results

Albany Panthers
Albany Panthers
Albany Panthers